The American College of Orgonomy (ACO) was established in 1968 and founded by Dr. Elsworth F. Baker, M.D. at the request of Wilhelm Reich who asked him to assume responsibility for the future of orgonomy. Its purpose is to set and maintain standards for all work in orgonomy, to promote and encourage scientific work in the field of orgonomy, and to provide training, education and information to those who are interested.

Located near Princeton, New Jersey, the ACO is a nonprofit educational and scientific organization devoted to setting and maintaining standards for work in the field of orgonomy. The College provides information, training, and research support for those interested and involved in orgonomy.

References

External links
 
 Journal of Orgonomy

Educational institutions established in 1968
Alternative medicine organizations
Orgonomy
Body psychotherapy
Non-profit organizations based in Princeton, New Jersey
Private universities and colleges in New Jersey
1968 establishments in New Jersey